Noel Linton Parlane (19 March 195121 June 2015) was a New Zealand country singer and yodeler who gained popularity during the 1980s with his release of albums on the RCA Victor label.

Biography
Noel was born in Roxburgh, an agricultural town in Central Otago, where he spent his early youth before moving to Dunedin where he attended Kaikorai Valley College. At the age of ten Noel routinely appeared on Radio 4XD's children's program where he befriended Trevor Dawe, a pianist, with whom he began appearing in talent shows. The pair performed locally under several titles such as 'The New Era', 'The Noel and Trev Duo', and finally 'The Sundowners' before splitting up in 1975. In 1977, Noel won the South Island Country Music Scroll after competing in the South Island Country Music Awards and the following year won the New Zealand Gold Guitar Award, earning him an audition with the New Zealand record label Music World. In 1978, Noel released his debut album titled 'Noel Parlane Country' which was certified gold, as were his following four albums. His 1979 release 'Country Heartaches' sold over 40,000 copies in Australia, expanding his popularity. Wanting more control over his content, Noel parted with Music World and was signed by the RCA Victor label, on which he released three albums with before relocating to Australia. Prior to moving to Australia, Noel frequently appeared on That's Country, a New Zealand country and western television variety show. Although he was unable to reach the same sales of records after his departure from Music World, Noel continued to make albums and perform both in Australia and New Zealand. He was inducted in both the Tamworth and Gore Hands of Fame. 

In 1998, he appeared on Ernest Tubb's Midnite Jamboree.

Personal life
Noel continued to perform up until his death. After suffering a fall after a performance, he was diagnosed with mesothelioma. He died in Brisbane on 21 June 2015, just two months after the release of his final album Everybody's Here. He was cremated and his ashes were buried at Green Park Cemetery, Dunedin.

Discography

Studio Albums
 Noel Parlane Country (Music World, 1978)
 Country Love (Music World, 1979)
 Country Heartaches (Music World, 1979)
 Old Time Country Music - 20 Golden Greats (Music World, 1981)
 Trucks & Trains (Music World, 1981)
 Drinking Them Beers (RCA Victor, 1982)
 Let’s Sing a Country Song (RCA Victor, 1984)
 Stepping Out (RCA Victor, 1987)
 Can I Count On You (Spectrum Records, 1994)
 Now and Then (Spectrum Records, 1997)
 Choosey (Capitol Records, 2003)
 You Bring Out the Best In Me (Kiwi Pacific Records, 2004)
 No Limits (Lbs Music, 2007)
 Encore (Lbs Music, 2012)
 Everybody's Here (Checked Label Services, 2015)

References

1951 births
2015 deaths
New Zealand country singers
Yodelers